Tedo Isakadze (born 27 June 1966) is a Georgian politician.

Biography

Education
In 1989 he graduated Tbilisi State University, the faculty of philology.

Student years
 During the student period, from 1986, he was propagandizing anti-Soviet Union activities.
 In 1987 was an activist of anti Soviet Union student movement and the founder of the first student dissident informal organization – "TSU student press-club"
 From 1988 together with his companions based on the newspaper of Tbilisi State University, begins publishing of " Student Page" with anti Soviet union and anti communist articles that were printed in semilegal form after the "restructuring" period.
 In 1989 the employee of "Georgian Christian Cultural Scientific Laboratory"  of Tbilisi State University is publishing articles about the History of Literature, political science and Art.
 In 1990s meanwhile he is operating the business activities.
 Meanwhile, in 1993 he is publishing the first Georgian independent daily newspaper "Iveria Express". From the same year together with his companions is establishing the movement "Political Club".

Politics
 In 1992-1995 represents the Chief of the State Department of Georgian Youth Affairs.
 1995-1999 is the Charge of Georgian President State of  Racha-Lechkhumi and Qvemo Svaneti. (Governor)
 1999-2002 is the Deputy of  Georgian State  Minister (Vice-Premier Minister)

Business
 From 2003 continues business activities and is the founder and the head of the Supervisory Board of the companies:  "Mister Grini" (HoReCa, Cateringa), "Intercatalogi "
 From 2011 represents the president of companies, Eastern Enterprise Group" and  'King Enterprises GE".
 He has a wife and two children.

References

1966 births
Living people
Tbilisi State University alumni
Politicians from Tbilisi